And Now... Ladies and Gentlemen is a 2002 thriller film directed by Claude Lelouch and starring Jeremy Irons and Patricia Kaas. Patricia Kaas also released a song with the same title on her 2002 album Piano Bar. Tracks from the album, which according to the cover notes were inspired by the film, were used in the movie. It was screened out of competition at the 2002 Cannes Film Festival.

Premise
Valentin (Jeremy Irons), a gentleman burglar like Arsene Lupine, is wanted by the police. He embarks on a sailboat for a tour of the world. Jane (Patricia Kaas), dreams of leaving the American-style bar in which she works as a jazz-singer. Valentin and Jane are made to love each other. Coping with problems remembering, they find themselves in a hotel on the coast of Morocco, where a jewelry theft took place.

Cast
 Jeremy Irons - Valentin Valentin
 Patricia Kaas - Jane Lester
 Thierry Lhermitte - Thierry
 Alessandra Martines - Françoise
 Claudia Cardinale - Madame Falconetti
 Jean-Marie Bigard - Dr. Lamy/Pharmacist
 Ticky Holgado - Boubou
 Yvan Attal - David
 Amidou - Police Inspector
 Sylvie Loeillet - Soleil
 Constantin Alexandrov - Monsieur Falconetti
 Stéphane Ferrara - Sam Hernandez, the Boxer
 Samuel Labarthe - Trumpet Player 
 Paul Freeman - English Customer
 Souad Amidou - Chambermaid

Reception
And Now... Ladies and Gentlemen received mixed reviews. On the review aggregator website Rotten Tomatoes, the film has an approval rating of 47%, based on 74 reviews, with an average rating of 5.5/10. The website's consensus reads, "The plot is convoluted and awash in suds."

References

External links
 
 

2002 films
2002 crime thriller films
2000s French-language films
French crime thriller films
Films directed by Claude Lelouch
Films shot in Paris
Films scored by Michel Legrand
2000s English-language films
2000s French films